Angkor Wat ("City/Capital of Temples") is a temple complex in Cambodia, located on a site measuring . The Guinness World Records considers it as the largest religious structure in the world. Originally constructed as a Hindu temple dedicated to the god Vishnu for the Khmer Empire by King Suryavarman II during the 12th century, it was gradually transformed into a Buddhist temple towards the end of the century; as such, it is also described as a "Hindu-Buddhist" temple.

Angkor Wat was built at the behest of the Khmer King Suryavarman II in the early 12th century in Yaśodharapura (present-day Angkor), the capital of the Khmer Empire, as his state temple and eventual mausoleum. Angkor Wat combines two basic plans of Khmer temple architecture: the temple-mountain and the later galleried temple. At the centre of the temple stands a quincunx of towers. Unlike most Angkorian temples, Angkor Wat is oriented to the west; scholars are divided as to the significance of this. The temple is admired for the grandeur and harmony of the architecture, its extensive bas-reliefs, and for the numerous devatas adorning its walls. The modern name Angkor Wat, alternatively Nokor Wat, means "Temple City" or "City of Temples" in Khmer. Angkor meaning "city" or "capital city", is a vernacular form of the word nokor, which comes from the Sanskrit/Pali word nagara (Devanāgarī: नगर). Wat is the word for "temple grounds", also derived from Sanskrit/Pali vāṭa (Devanāgarī: वाट), meaning "enclosure".

The original name of the temple was Vrah Viṣṇuloka or Parama Viṣṇuloka meaning "the sacred dwelling of Vishnu".

History

In an area of Cambodia where there is an essential group of ancient structures, it is the southernmost of Angkor's main sites.

The construction of Angkor Wat took place over 28 years from 1122 to 1150 CE during the reign of King Suryavarman II (ruled 1113–). A brahmin by the name of Divākarapaṇḍita (1040–) was responsible for urging Suryavarman II to construct the temple. All of the original religious motifs at Angkor Wat derived from Hinduism. Breaking from the Shaiva tradition of previous kings, Angkor Wat was instead dedicated to Vishnu. It was built as the king's state temple and capital city. As neither the foundation stela nor any contemporary inscriptions referring to the temple have been found, its original name is unknown, but it may have been known as "Varah Vishnu-lok" after the presiding deity. Work seems to have ended shortly after the king's death, leaving some of the bas-relief decoration unfinished. The term Vrah Viṣṇuloka or Parama Viṣṇuloka literally means "The king who has gone to the supreme world of Vishnu", which refer to Suryavarman II posthumously and intend to venerate his glory and memory.

In 1177, approximately 27 years after the death of Suryavarman II, Angkor was sacked by the Chams, the traditional enemies of the Khmer. Thereafter the empire was restored by a new king, Jayavarman VII, who established a new capital and state temple (Angkor Thom and the Bayon, respectively), a few kilometers north, dedicated to Buddhism, because the king believed that the Hindu gods had failed him. Angkor Wat was therefore also gradually converted into a Buddhist site, and many Hindu sculptures were replaced by Buddhist art.

Towards the end of the 12th century, Angkor Wat gradually transformed from a Hindu centre of worship to Buddhism, which continues to the present day. Angkor Wat is unusual among the Angkor temples in that although it was largely neglected after the 16th century, it was never completely abandoned. Fourteen inscriptions dated from the 17th century, discovered in the Angkor area, testify to Japanese Buddhist pilgrims that had established small settlements alongside Khmer locals. At that time, the temple was thought by the Japanese visitors to be the famed Jetavana garden of the Buddha, which was originally located in the kingdom of Magadha, India. The best-known inscription tells of Ukondayu Kazufusa, who celebrated the Khmer New Year at Angkor Wat in 1632.

One of the first Western visitors to the temple was António da Madalena, a Portuguese friar who visited in 1586 and said that it "is of such extraordinary construction that it is not possible to describe it with a pen, particularly since it is like no other building in the world. It has towers and decoration and all the refinements which the human genius can conceive of."

In 1622, The Poem of Angkor Wat composed in Khmer verse describes the beauty of Angkor Wat and creates a legend around the construction of the complex, supposedly a divine castle built for legendary Khmer king Preah Ket Mealea by Hindu god Preah Pisnukar (or Braḥ Bisṇukār, Vishvakarman), as Suryavarman II had already vanished from people's minds.

In 1860, with the help of French missionary Father Charles-Émile Bouillevaux, the temple was effectively rediscovered by the French naturalist and explorer Henri Mouhot, who popularised the site in the West through the publication of travel notes, in which he wrote:

In 1861 German anthropologist Adolf Bastian undertook a four-year trip to Southeast Asia. His account of this trip, The People of East Asia, ran to six volumes. When Bastian finally published the studies and observations during his Journey through Cambodia to Cochinchina in Germany in 1868 – told in detail but uninspiredly, above all without a single one of his drawings of the Angkorian sites – this work hardly made an impression, while everyone was talking about Henri Mouhot's posthumous work with vivid descriptions of Angkor, Travels in the Central Parts of Indo-China, Siam, Cambodia and Laos, published in 1864 through the Royal Geographical Society.

There were no ordinary dwellings or houses or other signs of settlement, including cooking utensils, weapons, or items of clothing usually found at ancient sites.

The artistic legacy of Angkor Wat and other Khmer monuments in the Angkor region led directly to France adopting Cambodia as a protectorate on 11 August 1863 and invading Siam to take control of the ruins. This quickly led to Cambodia reclaiming lands in the northwestern corner of the country such as the areas of Siem Reap, Battambang, and Sisophon which were under Siamese rule from 1795 to 1907.

Angkor Wat's aesthetics were on display in the plaster cast museum of Louis Delaporte called musée Indo-chinois which existed in the Parisian Trocadero Palace from c.1880 to the mid-1920s.

The 20th century saw a considerable restoration of Angkor Wat. Gradually teams of laborers and archeologists pushed back the jungle and exposed the expanses of stone, permitting the sun to once again illuminate the dark corners of the temple. Angkor Wat caught the attention and imagination of a wider audience in Europe when the pavilion of French protectorate of Cambodia, as part of French Indochina, recreated the life-size replica of Angkor Wat during Paris Colonial Exposition in 1931.

Cambodia gained independence from France on 9 November 1953 and has controlled Angkor Wat since then. From the colonial period onwards, until the site was nominated a UNESCO World Heritage in 1992, the temple of Angkor Wat was instrumental in the formation of the modern and gradually globalised concept of built cultural heritage.

Restoration work was interrupted by the Cambodian Civil War and Khmer Rouge control of the country during the 1970s and 1980s, but relatively little damage was done during this period. Camping Khmer Rouge forces used whatever wood remained in the building structures for firewood, and a shoot-out between Khmer Rouge and Vietnamese forces put a few bullet holes in a basrelief. Far more damage was done after the wars, by art thieves working out of Thailand, which, in the late 1980s and early 1990s, claimed almost every head that could be lopped off the structures, including reconstructions.

The temple is a symbol of Cambodia and is a source of national pride that has factored into Cambodia's diplomatic relations with France, the United States, and its neighbour Thailand. A depiction of Angkor Wat has been a part of Cambodian national flags since the introduction of the first version circa 1863. From a larger historical and transcultural perspective, however, the temple of Angkor Wat did not become a symbol of national pride sui generis but had been inscribed into a larger politico-cultural process of French-colonial heritage production in which the original temple site was presented in French colonial and universal exhibitions in Paris and Marseille between 1889 and 1937.

In December 2015, it was announced that a research team from the University of Sydney had found a previously unseen ensemble of buried towers built and demolished during the construction of Angkor Wat, as well as a massive structure of unknown purpose on its south side and wooden fortifications. The findings include evidence of low-density residential occupation in the region, with a road grid, ponds, and mounds. These indicate that the temple precinct, bounded by a moat and wall, may not have been used exclusively by the priestly elite, as was previously thought. The team used LiDAR, ground-penetrating radar and targeted excavation to map Angkor Wat.

According to a myth, the construction of Angkor Wat was ordered by Indra to serve as a palace for his son Precha Ket Mealea. According to the 13th-century Chinese traveller Zhou Daguan, some believed that the temple was constructed in a single night by a divine architect.

Architecture

Site and plan
Angkor Wat is a unique combination of the temple mountain (the standard design for the empire's state temples) and the later plan of concentric galleries, most of which were originally derived from religious beliefs of Hinduism. The construction of Angkor Wat suggests that there was a celestial significance with certain features of the temple. This is observed in the temple's east–west orientation, and lines of sight from terraces within the temple that show specific towers to be at the precise location of the solstice at sunrise. The temple is a representation of Mount Meru, the home of the gods according to Hindu mythology: the central quincunx of towers symbolise the five peaks of the mountain, and the walls and moat symbolise the surrounding mountain ranges and ocean. Access to the upper areas of the temple was progressively more exclusive, with the laity being admitted only to the lowest level.

The Angkor Wat temple's main tower aligns with the morning sun of the spring equinox. Unlike most Khmer temples, Angkor Wat is oriented to the west rather than the east. This has led many (including Maurice Glaize and George Coedès) to conclude that Suryavarman intended it to serve as his funerary temple. Further evidence for this view is provided by the bas-reliefs, which proceed in a counter-clockwise direction—prasavya in Hindu terminology—as this is the reverse of the normal order. Rituals take place in reverse order during Brahminic funeral services.

Archaeologist Charles Higham also describes a container that may have been a funerary jar that was recovered from the central tower. It has been nominated by some as the greatest expenditure of energy on the disposal of a corpse. Freeman and Jacques, however, note that several other temples of Angkor depart from the typical eastern orientation, and suggest that Angkor Wat's alignment was due to its dedication to Vishnu, who was associated with the west.

Drawing on the temple's alignment and dimensions, and on the content and arrangement of the bas-reliefs, researcher Eleanor Mannikka argues that the structure represents a claimed new era of peace under King Suryavarman II: "as the measurements of solar and lunar time cycles were built into the sacred space of Angkor Wat, this divine mandate to rule was anchored to consecrated chambers and corridors meant to perpetuate the king's power and to honour and placate the deities manifest in the heavens above." Mannikka's suggestions have been received with a mixture of interest and scepticism in academic circles. She distances herself from the speculations of others, such as Graham Hancock, that Angkor Wat is part of a representation of the constellation Draco.

The oldest surviving plan of Angkor Wat dates to 1715 and is credited to Fujiwara Tadayoshi. The plan is stored in the Suifu Meitoku-kai Shokokan Museum in Mito, Japan.

Style

Angkor Wat is the prime example of the classical style of Khmer architecture—the Angkor Wat style—to which it has given its name. By the 12th century, Khmer architects had become skilled and confident in the use of sandstone (rather than brick or laterite) as the main building material. Most of the visible areas are sandstone blocks, while laterite was used for the outer wall and hidden structural parts. The binding agent used to join the blocks is yet to be identified, although natural resins or slaked lime has been suggested.

The temple has drawn praise above all for the harmony of its design. According to Maurice Glaize, a mid-20th-century conservator of Angkor, the temple "attains a classic perfection by the restrained monumentality of its finely balanced elements and the precise arrangement of its proportions. It is a work of power, unity, and style."

Architecturally, the elements characteristic of the style include the ogival, redented towers shaped like lotus buds; half-galleries to broaden passageways; axial galleries connecting enclosures; and the cruciform terraces which appear along the main axis of the temple. Typical decorative elements are devatas (or apsaras), bas-reliefs, pediments, extensive garlands and narrative scenes. The statuary of Angkor Wat is considered conservative, being more static and less graceful than earlier work. Other elements of the design have been destroyed by looting and the passage of time, including gilded stucco on the towers, gilding on some figures on the bas-reliefs, and wooden ceiling panels and doors.

Architect Jacques Dumarçay believes the layout of Angkor Wat borrows Chinese influence in its system of galleries which join at right angles to form courtyards. However, the axial pattern embedded in the plan of Angkor Wat may be derived from Southeast Asian cosmology in combination with the mandala represented by the main temple.

Features

Outer enclosure

The moat extends 1.5 kilometres from east to west and 1.3 kilometres from north to south. Access to the temple is by an earth bank to the east and a sandstone causeway to the west; the latter, the main entrance, is a later addition, possibly replacing a wooden bridge. There are gopuras at each of the cardinal points; the western is by far the largest and has three ruined towers. Glaize notes that this gopura both hides and echoes the form of the temple proper.

Under the southern tower is a statue known as Ta Reach, originally an eight-armed statue of Vishnu that may have occupied the temple's central shrine. Galleries run between the towers and as far as two further entrances on either side of the gopura often referred to as "elephant gates", as they are large enough to admit those animals. These galleries have square pillars on the outer (west) side and a closed wall on the inner (east) side. The ceiling between the pillars is decorated with lotus rosettes; the west face of the wall with dancing figures; and the east face of the wall with balustered windows, dancing male figures on prancing animals, and devatas, including (south of the entrance) the only one in the temple to be showing her teeth.

The outer wall encloses a space of 820,000 square metres (203 acres), which besides the temple proper was originally occupied by the city and, to the north of the temple, the royal palace. Like all secular buildings of Angkor, these were built of perishable materials rather than of stone, so nothing remains of them except the outlines of some of the streets. Most of the area is now covered by forest. A  causeway connects the western gopura to the temple proper, with naga balustrades and six sets of steps leading down to the city on either side. Each side also features a library with entrances at each cardinal point, in front of the third set of stairs from the entrance, and a pond between the library and the temple itself. The ponds are later additions to the design, as is the cruciform terrace guarded by lions connecting the causeway to the central structure.

Central structure

The temple stands on a terrace raised higher than the city. It is made of three rectangular galleries rising to a central tower, each level higher than the last. The two inner galleries each have four large towers at their ordinal corners (that is, NW, NE, SE, and SW) surrounding a higher fifth tower. This pattern is sometimes called a quincunx and represents the mountains of Meru. Because the temple faces west, the features are set back towards the east, leaving more space to be filled in each enclosure and gallery on the west side; for the same reason, the west-facing steps are shallower than those on the other sides.

Mannikka interprets the galleries as being dedicated to the king, Brahma, the moon, and Vishnu. Each gallery has a gopura at each of the points. The gallery is open to the outside of the temple, with columned half-galleries extending and buttressing the structure. Connecting the outer gallery to the second enclosure on the west side is a cruciform cloister called Preah Poan (meaning "The Thousand Buddhas" Gallery). Buddha images were left in the cloister by pilgrims over the centuries, although most have now been removed. This area has many inscriptions relating to the good deeds of pilgrims, most written in Khmer but others in Burmese and Japanese. The four small courtyards marked out by the cloister may originally have been filled with water. North and south of the cloister are libraries.

Beyond, the second and inner galleries are connected to two flanking libraries by another cruciform terrace, again a later addition. From the second level upwards, devatas abound on the walls, singly or in groups of up to four. Three sets of steps on each side lead up to the corner towers and gopuras of the inner gallery. The steep stairways may represent the difficulty of ascending to the kingdom of the gods. This inner gallery, called the Bakan, is a  square with axial galleries connecting each gopura with the central shrine and subsidiary shrines located below the corner towers.

The roofings of the galleries are decorated with the motif of the body of a snake ending in the heads of lions or garudas. Carved lintels and pediments decorate the entrances to the galleries and the shrines. The shrine itself, originally occupied by a statue of Vishnu and open on each side, was walled in when the temple was converted to Theravada Buddhism, the new walls featuring standing Buddhas. In 1934, the conservator George Trouvé excavated the pit beneath the central shrine: filled with sand and water it had already been robbed of its treasure, but he did find a sacred foundation deposit of gold leaf two metres above ground level.

Decoration

Integrated with the architecture of the building, one of the causes for its fame is Angkor Wat's extensive decoration, which predominantly takes the form of bas-relief friezes. The inner walls of the outer gallery bear a series of large-scale scenes mainly depicting episodes from the Hindu epics the Ramayana and the Mahabharata. Higham has called these "the greatest known linear arrangement of stone carving". From the north-west corner anti-clockwise, the western gallery shows the Battle of Lanka (from the Ramayana, in which Rama defeats Ravana) and the Battle of Kurukshetra (from the Mahabharata, showing the mutual annihilation of the Kaurava and Pandava clans). On the southern gallery follow the only historical scene, a procession of Suryavarman II, then the 32 hells and 37 heavens of Hinduism.

On the eastern gallery is one of the most celebrated scenes, the Churning of the Sea of Milk, showing 92 asuras and 88 devas using the serpent Vasuki to churn the sea under Vishnu's direction (Mannikka counts only 91 asuras and explains the asymmetrical numbers as representing the number of days from the winter solstice to the spring equinox, and from the equinox to the summer solstice). It is followed by Vishnu defeating asuras (a 16th-century addition). The northern gallery shows Krishna's victory over Bana (where according to Glaize, "The workmanship is at its worst").

Angkor Wat is decorated with depictions of apsaras and devata; there are more than 1,796 depictions of devata in the present research inventory. Angkor Wat architects employed small apsara images as decorative motifs on pillars and walls. They incorporated larger devata images (all full-body portraits measuring approximately ) more prominently at every level of the temple from the entry pavilion to the tops of the high towers. In 1927, Sappho Marchal published a study cataloging the remarkable diversity of their hair, headdresses, garments, stance, jewellery, and decorative flowers, which Marchal concluded were based on actual practices of the Angkor period.

Construction techniques

The monument was made of five to ten million sandstone blocks with a maximum weight of 1.5 tons each. The entire city of Angkor used far greater amounts of stone than all the Egyptian pyramids combined and occupied an area significantly greater than modern-day Paris.

However, Etsuo Uchida and Ichita Shimoda of Waseda University in Tokyo, Japan have discovered in 2011 a shorter  canal connecting Mount Kulen and Angkor Wat using satellite imagery. The two believe that the Khmer used this route instead.

Virtually all of its surfaces, columns, lintels and even roofs are carved. There are kilometres of reliefs illustrating scenes from Indian literature including unicorns, griffins, winged dragons pulling chariots, as well as warriors following an elephant-mounted leader, and celestial dancing girls with elaborate hairstyles. The gallery wall alone is decorated with almost  of bas reliefs. Holes on some of the Angkor walls indicate that they may have been decorated with bronze sheets. These were highly prized in ancient times and were prime targets for robbers.

While excavating Khajuraho, Alex Evans, a stonemason, and sculptor recreated a stone sculpture under , this took about 60 days to carve. Roger Hopkins and Mark Lehner also conducted experiments to quarry limestone which took 12 quarrymen 22 days to quarry about 400 tons of stone. The labour force to quarry, transport, carve and install so much sandstone probably ran into the thousands including many highly skilled artisans. The skills required to carve these sculptures were developed hundreds of years earlier, as demonstrated by some artefacts that have been dated to the seventh century, before the Khmer came to power.

Angkor Wat in the present

Restoration and conservation

As with most other ancient temples in Cambodia, Angkor Wat has faced extensive damage and deterioration by a combination of plant overgrowth, fungi, ground movements, war damage, and theft. The war damage to Angkor Wat's temples however has been very limited, compared to the rest of Cambodia's temple ruins, and it has also received the most attentive restoration.

The restoration of Angkor Wat in the modern era began with the establishment of the Conservation d'Angkor (Angkor Conservancy) by the École française d'Extrême-Orient (EFEO) in 1908; before that date, activities at the site were primarily concerned with exploration. The Conservation d'Angkor was responsible for the research, conservation, and restoration activities carried out at Angkor until the early 1970s, and a major restoration of Angkor was undertaken in the 1960s.

Work on Angkor was abandoned during the Khmer Rouge era and the Conservation d'Angkor was disbanded in 1975. Between 1986 and 1992, the Archaeological Survey of India carried out restoration work on the temple, as France did not recognise the Cambodian government at the time. Criticisms have been raised about both the early French restoration attempts and particularly the later Indian work, with concerns over the damage done to the stone surface by the use of chemicals and cement.

In 1992, following an appeal for help by Norodom Sihanouk, Angkor Wat was listed in UNESCO's World Heritage in Danger (later removed in 2004) and as a World Heritage Site together with an appeal by UNESCO to the international community to save Angkor. Zoning of the area was designated to protect the Angkor site in 1994, APSARA was established in 1995 to protect and manage the area, and a law to protect Cambodian heritage was passed in 1996.

Several countries such as France, Japan, and China are now involved in Angkor Wat conservation projects. The German Apsara Conservation Project (GACP) is working to protect the devatas, and other bas-reliefs that decorate the temple, from damage. The organisation's survey found that around 20% of the devatas were in very poor condition, mainly because of natural erosion and deterioration of the stone but in part also due to earlier restoration efforts. Other work involves the repair of collapsed sections of the structure, and prevention of further collapse: the west facade of the upper level, for example, has been buttressed by scaffolding since 2002, while a Japanese team completed the restoration of the north library of the outer enclosure in 2005.

Microbial biofilms have been found degrading sandstone at Angkor Wat, Preah Khan, and the Bayon and West Prasat in Angkor. The dehydration- and radiation-resistant filamentous cyanobacteria produce organic acids that degrade the stone. A dark filamentous fungus was found in internal and external Preah Khan samples, while the alga Trentepohlia was found only in samples taken from external, pink-stained stone at Preah Khan. Replicas have been made to replace some of the lost or damaged sculptures.

Tourism

Since the 1990s, Angkor Wat has become a major tourist destination. In 1993, there were only 7,650 visitors to the site; by 2004, government figures show that 561,000 foreign visitors had arrived in Siem Reap province that year, approximately 50% of all foreign tourists in Cambodia. The number reached over a million in 2007, and over two million by 2012. Most visited Angkor Wat, which received over two million foreign tourists in 2013, and 2.6 million by 2018.

The site was managed by the private SOKIMEX group between 1990 and 2016, which rented it from the Cambodian government. The influx of tourists has so far caused relatively little damage, other than some graffiti. Ropes and wooden steps have been introduced to protect the bas-reliefs and floors, respectively. Tourism has also provided some additional funds for maintenance—as of 2000 approximately 28% of ticket revenues across the entire Angkor site was spent on the temples—although most work is carried out by teams sponsored by foreign governments rather than by the Cambodian authorities.

Since Angkor Wat has seen significant growth in tourism throughout the years, UNESCO and its International Co-ordinating Committee for the Safeguarding and Development of the Historic Site of Angkor (ICC), in association with representatives from the Royal Government and APSARA, organised seminars to discuss the concept of "cultural tourism". Wanting to avoid commercial and mass tourism, the seminars emphasised the importance of providing high-quality accommodation and services for the Cambodian government to benefit economically, while also incorporating the richness of Cambodian culture. In 2001, this incentive resulted in the concept of the "Angkor Tourist City" which would be developed about traditional Khmer architecture, contain leisure and tourist facilities, and provide luxurious hotels capable of accommodating large numbers of tourists.

The prospect of developing such large tourist accommodations has encountered concerns from both APSARA and the ICC, claiming that previous tourism developments in the area have neglected construction regulations and that more of these projects have the potential to damage landscape features. Also, the large scale of these projects have begun to threaten the quality of the nearby town's water, sewage, and electricity systems. It has been noted that such high frequency of tourism and growing demand for quality accommodations in the area, such as the development of a large highway, has had a direct effect on the underground water table, subsequently straining the structural stability of the temples at Angkor Wat.

Locals of Siem Reap have also voiced concern that the charm and atmosphere of their town have been compromised to entertain tourism. Since this local atmosphere is the key component to projects like Angkor Tourist City, the local officials continue to discuss how to successfully incorporate future tourism without sacrificing local values and culture.

At the ASEAN Tourism Forum 2012, it was agreed that Borobudur and Angkor Wat would become sister sites and the provinces sister provinces.

In 2020, the COVID-19 pandemic led to travel restrictions being introduced across the world, which had a severe impact on Cambodia's tourism sector. As a result, visitors to Angkor Wat plummeted, leaving the usually crowded complex almost deserted.

See also

 Cambodia
 Indosphere
 Greater India
 Buddhism in Cambodia
 Buddhism in Southeast Asia
 List of Hindu temples
 List of Buddhist temples
 List of tallest structures built before the 20th century

References

Bibliography
 
 Briggs, Lawrence Robert (1951, reprinted 1999). The Ancient Khmer Empire. White Lotus. 
 Falser, Michael (2020). Angkor Wat – A Transcultural History of Heritage. Volume 1: Angkor in France. From Plaster Casts to Exhibition Pavilions. Volume 2: Angkor in Cambodia. From Jungle Find to Global Icon. Berlin-Boston DeGruyter 
 Forbes, Andrew; Henley, David (2011). Angkor, Eighth Wonder of the World. Chiang Mai: Cognoscenti Books. 
 Freeman, Michael and Jacques, Claude (1999). Ancient Angkor. River Books. .
 Higham, Charles (2001). The Civilization of Angkor. Phoenix. 
 Higham, Charles (2003). Early Cultures of Mainland Southeast Asia. Art Media Resources. 
 Hing Thoraxy. Achievement of "APSARA": Problems and Resolutions in the Management of the Angkor Area
 
 Petrotchenko, Michel (2011). Focusing on the Angkor Temples: The Guidebook, 383 pages, Amarin Printing and Publishing, 2nd edition, 
 Ray, Nick (2002). Lonely Planet guide to Cambodia (4th edition).

External links

 
 Buckley, Michael (1998). Vietnam, Cambodia and Laos Handbook. Avalon Travel Publications. Online excerpt The Churning of the Ocean of Milk retrieved 25 July 2005
 Glaize, Maurice (2003 edition of an English translation of the 1993 French fourth edition). The Monuments of the Angkor Group. Retrieved 14 July 2005
 University of Heidelberg, Germany, Chair of Global Art History, Project (Michael Falser): Heritage as a Transcultural Concept – Angkor Wat from an Object of Colonial Archaeology to a Contemporary Global Icon 
 Battle Of Kurukshetra Mural At Angkor Wat, Centre For 21st Century Humanities, 2018
 Angkor Wat and Angkor photo gallery by Jaroslav Poncar May 2010
 Angkor digital media archive – Photos, laser scans, panoramas of Angkor Wat's Western Causeway and Banteay Kdei from a CyArk/Sophia University/University of California partnership
 BBC: Map reveals ancient urban sprawl August 2007
 Inventory of Angkor Wat devata (sacred Khmer women) February 2010

12th-century Hindu temples
12th-century Buddhist temples
Angkorian sites in Siem Reap Province
Khmer Empire
Archaeoastronomy
Archaeological sites in Cambodia
Buddhist pilgrimage sites in Cambodia
Buddhist temples in Siem Reap Province
National symbols of Cambodia
Tourist attractions in Cambodia
Tourist attractions in Siem Reap province
World Heritage Sites in Cambodia
Articles containing video clips
Hindu temples in Cambodia
Vishnu temples